Cardamyla hercophora is a species of snout moth in the genus Cardamyla. It was described by Edward Meyrick in 1884. It is found in Australia.

References

Moths described in 1884
Pyralini